Network Control Program (usually given as NCP) was the name for the software on hosts which implemented the Network Control Protocol of the ARPANET.

It was almost universally referred to by the acronym, NCP. This was later taken over to refer to the protocol suite itself.

NCP's were written for many operating systems, including Multics, TENEX, UNIX and TOPS-10, and many of those NCP's survive (although of course they are now only used by vintage computer enthusiasts).

References

ARPANET

External links 
 Network Control Program - NCP details at the Computer History Wiki
 SRI-NOSC - complete V6 UNIX NCP source
 Illinois NCP Documentation